Kashibadze is a Georgian noble family, appearing at the end of the 14th century as a continuation of the Kachibadze (ქაჩიბაძე).

The surname Kashibadze, literally derives from the 15th-century nobleman Barata "The Great" Kachibadze treasurer of Georgian King Alexander I. It is believed that his ancestor was King George V Amiredjibi Kawtar Kachibadze, a prominent Georgian politician of the 14th century. Analyzing their surname and given some historical realities Academician Simon Janashia claimed that Kachibaidze came from Abkhazia, and their original surname - Kechba (Gechba).
 
The Kachibadze are first attested in an early 14th-century inscription from the Pitareti monastery.

References 

Noble families of Georgia (country)
Georgian-language surnames